The 1981 Atlanta Falcons season was the Falcons' 16th season. The Falcons got off to a solid 3–0 start, but lost three key starters for the season in a 34–17 win at Fulton County Stadium over the San Francisco 49ers. The Falcons would go on to finish the season with a 7–9 record, losing seven games by five points or less, thus missing the playoffs for the first time since 1979.

Offseason

NFL draft

Personnel

Staff

Roster

Regular season

Schedule

Standings

Awards and records 
 Steve Bartkowski, Falcons game record, most passing yards in one game, 416 yards (on November 15, 1981) 
 William Andrews, Falcons game record, most receiving yards in one game, 198 yards (on November 15, 1981). Which was later broken by Roddy White when he got 210 yards against the 49ers in the 2009 season.

References

External links 
 1981 Atlanta Falcons at Pro-Football-Reference.com

Atlanta
Atlanta Falcons seasons
Atlanta